Çardak is a town (belde) in the Lapseki District, Çanakkale Province, Turkey. Its population is 3,705 (2021).

Geography 
Çardak is situated on the Anatolian coast of the Çanakkale (Dardanelles) Strait. It is also a ferry terminal to the Rumeli (European portion of Turkey).

History 
Çardak was founded by Turks  in the 14th century as an Anatolian base for the early Ottoman operations in Rumeli. According to mayor's page the town was named by Süleyman Pasha who was the şehzade (prince) and the first Ottoman commander in Rumeli. The oldest buildings in the town belong to a complex constructed by Gazi Yakup in 1479 (during the reign of Mehmet II) .

Economy 
Fishing and agriculture are the two main economic sectors of the town. Tourism is also promising. The beaches of the town are in Kum ada (a small sand island) just in front of Çardak.

References

Populated places in Çanakkale Province
Towns in Turkey
Lapseki District
Populated coastal places in Turkey